is a junction passenger railway station located in the city of Narashino, Chiba, Japan, operated by the East Japan Railway Company (JR East).

Lines 
Tsudanuma Station is served by the Sōbu Main Line (rapid service and local service). It is 26.7 kilometers from the starting point of both lines at Tokyo Station.

Station layout
Tsudanuma Station consists of three island platforms serving six tracks, with an elevated station building. The station has a Midori no Madoguchi staffed ticket office.

Platforms

History
The station opened on September 21, 1895.

Passenger statistics
In fiscal 2019, the station was used by an average of 102,846 passengers daily (boarding passengers only).

The daily passenger figures (boarding passengers only) in previous years are as shown below.

Surrounding area
 Shin-Tsudanuma Station ( Shin-Keisei Line)
 Chiba Institute of Technology

See also
 List of railway stations in Japan

References

External links

Tsudanuma Station Information (East Japan Railway Company) 

Railway stations in Japan opened in 1895
Railway stations in Chiba Prefecture
Sōbu Main Line
Narashino